Shatara Michelle Ford is an American director, writer, and producer. Their feature film directorial debut Test Pattern (2019) received critical acclaim.

Career
Ford gained prominence in 2019 for Test Pattern, their feature film directorial debut. The story follows Renesha and Evan, a young interracial couple seeking medical care after Renesha is sexually assaulted by a stranger. Ford also wrote and produced the film. Test Pattern debuted in August 2019 at the BlackStar Film Festival, where it received the Lionsgate/STARZ Producer Award. Additional accolades were awarded at the New Orleans Film Festival and the deadCENTER Film Festival.

Their forthcoming coming-of-age film, Queen Elizabeth, was named to the 2017 Black List. It is in development as of 2021.

They cited German Expressionism and Alfred Hitchcock as key influences.

Personal life 
Ford was raised in St. Louis, Missouri. Ford uses they/them pronouns.

Awards and nominations

References

External links 

Year of birth missing (living people)
Living people
American directors
African-American film producers
African-American screenwriters
Writers from St. Louis